A global union federation (GUF) is an international federation of national trade unions organizing in specific industry sectors or occupational groups.  Historically, such federations in the social democratic tradition described as international trade secretariats (ITS), while those in the Christian democratic tradition described themselves as international trade federations.  Equivalent sectoral bodies linked to the World Federation of Trade Unions described themselves as Trade Union Internationals.

Many unions are members of one or more global union federations, relevant to the sectors where they have their members. Individual unions may also be affiliated to a national trade union centre, which in turn can be affiliated to the International Trade Union Confederation (ITUC) or the WFTU.

Current federations

Former secretariats

See also 
Global Unions

Notes

Citations

Sources 

Books
 
 
 
 
 
Articles
 
 
Profiles
 
 

 
Labor relations